The Finno-Ugrian suicide hypothesis proposes to link genetic ties originating among Finno-Ugric peoples to high rate of suicide, claiming an allele common among them is responsible.

Mari and Udmurts have been found to have a three times higher suicide rate than Finns and Hungarians. It has been thus theorized that such a possible allele may have arisen in those populations.

However, contrary to the hypothesis, available contemporary (1990–1994) suicide rates were uniformly negatively associated with these ancestry proportions. The findings of this first test outside Europe are therefore conflicting. A proposal based on the geographical study approach is offered to further the progress of investigations into the genetics of suicide.

See also
 Finno-Ugric countries
 Human genetic variation
 Finnish heritage disease
 Gloomy Sunday
 List of countries by suicide rate

References

Behavioural genetics
Behavioural sciences
Finno-Ugric peoples
Suicide